Kalyan Singhal is an Indian American scholar, editor, and social entrepreneur. He is the Doris E. and Robert V. McCurdy Distinguished Professor of Management at the Merrick School of Business, University of Baltimore.  Kalyan has contributed to the fields of innovation, international trade, management sciences, manufacturing operations, operations research, service operations, supply chain management, and sustainable operations. He is the founder editor-in-chief of Production and Operations Management Journal  and the founding president of Production and Operations Management Society. Kalyan was elected as an INFORMS fellow in 2004, fellow of Production and Operations Management Society.

Biography 

Kalyan Singhal was born in 1946 in Mhow, India. He received his doctorate in business from Kent State University in Kent, Ohio, BTech in Mechanical Engineering from Indian Institute of Technology, Bombay. Singhal is married to Jaya Asthana Singhal, currently the Frank Baker Chair for Research Excellence at the Merrick School of Business, University of Baltimore. They have a daughter, Jyoti.

Career 
Kalyan served on the faculty of Indian Institute of Management, Bangalore from 1974 to 1977, where he founded the Department of Production and Operations Management. Later he served on the faculties of US business schools including those at the University of Arizona,  and the University of Houston.  He is currently a Distinguished Professor of Management at the Merrick School of Business, University of Baltimore.

In 1989, Kalyan founded the Production and Operations Management Society dedicated to the creation and dissemination of knowledge in operations and supply chain management.  He also founded the society's journal, Production and Operations Management (POM) in 1992 and has served as its editor in chief since. 

Singhal recently founded the Management and Business Review, a journal for executives and managers, and serves as co-editor in chief along with Wallace Hopp of the University of Michigan's Ross School of Business and Christopher Ittner of The University of Pennsylvania's Wharton School.  Forbes magazine interviewed Singhal, calling MBR a rival to the Harvard Business Review. 

Kalyan's has published in leading journals in innovation, operations, and supply-chain management: the Academy of Management Review, the Harvard Business Review, the INFORMS Journal of Computing, the European Journal of Operations Research, INFORMS Interfaces, the International Journal of Production Research, the Journal of Operations Management, Management Science, Manufacturing and Service Operations Management, Operations Research, and Production and Operations Management.  Jaya Singhal is his frequent coauthor. He is among the only 25 authors in the world to have published in four "top" operations management journals.

Kalyan's op-eds have appeared in The Baltimore Sun, India Abroad, The Hindu, and the Hindustan Times, and his commentary has appeared in BusinessWeek, The Economist, and The Washington Post.

Honors and awards 
Kalyan is an elected fellow at INFORMS and Production and Operations Management Society.  The Production and Operations Management Society has instituted an annual Kalyan Singhal Award ($30,000) to recognize innovations in companies.

References

University of Baltimore faculty
Production and Operations Management editors
IIT Bombay alumni
1946 births
Living people